Mollie Dent-Brocklehurst (born c. 1971) is a British art curator who was the director of London's Pace Gallery until December 2015. She and her family own Sudeley Castle, where she has curated art and sculpture exhibitions.

Background 

Dent-Brocklehurst is the daughter of Mark Dent-Brocklehurst and Elizabeth née Chipps. Her father died in 1972, and her mother married Henry Cubitt, 4th Baron Ashcombe, in 1979.

Through her paternal grandfather, Major John Henry Dent-Brocklehurst, she is a descendant of Henry Lascelles, 3rd Earl of Harewood, which makes her a fourth cousin of David Lascelles, 8th Earl of Harewood. Through her paternal grandfather, whose sister Marjorie Brocklehurst married Michael Hicks Beach, Viscount Quenington, she is also a second cousin of Michael Hicks Beach, 3rd Earl St Aldwyn.

She married Duncan Ward in July 2002 at Sudeley Castle, Winchcombe, Gloucestershire, England. Her children are Lucien Ward (2002) and Violet Ward (2004). She separated from Duncan Ward in July 2012.

Art career 

Dent-Brocklehurst began her career at Sotheby's before working for Gagosian for 10 years, first in New York City and then as director of his first London gallery. In 2008 she joined Abramovich's and Zhukova's The Garage in Moscow as international director and programme co-ordinator where she continued in an advisory role following her return to London in 2010 to set up the London Pace Gallery.

Ancestry

References

External links 
 https://web.archive.org/web/20140327102816/http://www.pacegallery.com/london

1970s births
Year of birth missing (living people)
British curators
Living people